Lee Ye-hyun is a South Korean actress and model. She is best known for her roles in dramas such as Extraordinary You, The Master of Revenge and Andante.

Filmography

Television series

Film

References

External links 
 
 
 

1995 births
Living people
21st-century South Korean actresses
South Korean female models
South Korean television actresses
South Korean film actresses